Tennessee Barn Dance was a live American country music program broadcast by WNOX radio in Knoxville, Tennessee. It began in January 1942 and was held at the Old Lyric Theatre in Knoxville. In the 1980's the show was hosted by Archie Campbell from Hee Haw, aired on CBS television, and aired from the live stage show at the historical WNOX Auditorium, on Whittle Springs Rd. in Knoxville, TN.

Performers 
{|
| width="33%" valign="top"|
 Roy Acuff
 Jack Anglin
 Chet Atkins
 Charlie and Danny Bailey
 Lowell Blanchard
 Brewster Brothers
 Carl Butler
 Archie Campbell
 Bill Carlisle
 Cliff Carlisle
 James Carson
 Martha Carson
 Anita Carter
 Helen Carter
 Maybelle Carter
| width="33%" valign="top"|
 June Carter
 Cowboy Copas
 Hugh Cross
 Lynn Davis
 Lester Flatt
 Don Gibson
 Eddie Hill
 Homer and Jethro
 Cousin Jody
 Pee Wee King
 Jamup Harry Levan
 Sam McGee
 Benny Martin
 Emory Martin
 Charlie Monroe
| width="34%" valign="top"|
 Buster Moore
 Molly O'Day
 Osborne Brothers
 Red Rector
 Earl Scruggs
 Jimmie Skinner
 Carl Smith
 Smitty Smith
 Roy Sneed
 Spivey Mountain Boys
 Carl Story
 Kitty Wells
 Webster Brothers
 Honey Wiles
 Mac Wiseman
 Johnnie Wright
 Robert Carter
 Mark Carter
 Wade Carter
 Donnie Moneymaker
 Mary Mincey
 Sharon Taylor
 Harold Brewer
 Judy Spiva
 Ralph Loveday

References
 Encyclopedia of Country, Western & Gospel Music
Hanson, Bradley, "The Tennessee Jamboree: Local Radio, the Barn Dance, and Cultural Life in Appalachian East Tennessee," Southern Spaces, November 20, 2008.
https://www.google.com/books/edition/Knoxville_s_WNOX/tQRRVfin24UC?hl=en&gbpv=1&dq=wnox+tennessee+barndance&printsec=frontcover
American country music radio programs